Liverpool Warriors are an American soccer club based in the Dallas/Fort Worth metroplex affiliated with Liverpool F.C. They previously fielded a team in the National Premier Soccer League (NPSL). They played their games at various high school stadiums including 2,000 capacity John Clark Field in Plano, Texas. They discontinued fielding a NPSL team in 2017, but continue as a youth development program.

Year-by-year

External links
Liverpool Warriors official website 

Association football clubs established in 2013
National Premier Soccer League teams
Soccer clubs in Texas
2013 establishments in Texas